Northeastern Cradle Song is a lullaby known widely in China, and is a folk song representative of Northeast China.

General

The Northeastern Cradle Song is a lullaby known to many people in China.  It is a folk song representative of Northeast China.

This cradle song is said to be originally sung in Pulandian, now part of Greater Dalian, at the time when Pulandian was called New Jin Prefecture (in ), located north of Jinzhou (in )).

Lyrics

There are slight differences in the lyrics that people use. The following has been taken in Dalian, Liaoning Province, China.

In popular culture 
 In the film The Last Emperor, Ar Mo sang this lullaby twice, to her own baby and to Puyi.

See also

 Lullaby
 Folk song
 Northeast China
 Tha Tha Thabungton

References

External links
 Northeastern Cradle Song (sung by Xu Guizhu in 1962)

Lullabies
Chinese folk songs